Joel T. Geist (born September 21, 1982, in Denver, Colorado, U.S.) is an American actor.

He is known for his performances on television, ranging from Doug in NBC's short-lived drama Windfall, to his portrayal of real life, former prison inmate Alan Beaman, later exonerated after being found to be innocent, in the Discovery Channel's docu-drama Guilty or Innocent. Geist has also begun a film career most recently punctuated by his starring role beside Highlander's Adrian Paul in the 2006 indie horror film Séance and has co-produced such short films as Action Figures, which he also starred in. Geist is translated to English as spirit or ghost.

References

1982 births
Living people
American male television actors
American male film actors
Male actors from Colorado